Goričica may refer to: 

Goričica may refer to:

In Croatia:
Goričica, Croatia

In Slovenia:
Goričica, Šentjur, a settlement in the Municipality of Šentjur
Goričica pod Krimom, a settlement in the Municipality of Brezovica (known as Goričica until 1953)
Goričica pri Ihanu, a settlement in the Municipality of Domžale (known as Goričica until 1953)
Goričica pri Moravčah, a settlement in the Municipality of Moravče (known as Goričica until 1955)
Mala Goričica, a settlement in the Municipality of Ivančna Gorica (known as Goričica until 1955)